XYZ Films is an American film production and sales company founded in 2008 by Aram Tertzakian, Nate Bolotin and Nick Spicer, and is based in Los Angeles. It focuses on international genre films, including The Raid: Redemption, The Raid 2 and On the Job.

According to an article from Variety, XYZ Films has licensed more than 200 films since 2009. It has produced a handful of Netflix original films, including Apostle (2018), The Night Comes For Us (2015), and I Don't Feel at Home in this World Anymore (2017), among others.

History
XYZ Films was founded by Aram Tertzakian, Nate Bolotin, and Nick Spicer, who met at the University of California, Los Angeles. All had worked previously in the industry.  Todd Brown, editor-in-chief of film website Twitch Film, joined after they invested there. Early deals included one with Time Inc. that did not produce any projects but raised their profile.  Believing the market in the US to be too small, they invested in international genre films.

The Raid: Redemption, an Indonesian action film that was produced on a budget of around $1 million, grossed over $14 million worldwide.  They partnered with French film distributor Celluloid Dreams in 2010, and, in 2013, they expanded beyond North American sales into international sales.  XYZ limits budgets to keep costs down, then markets films to genre fans based on its reputation. XYZ said they focus on commercial films that still take risks.  In 2015, they partnered with distributor Abbolita Films.

In October 2017, XYZ Films founders Aram Tertzakian, Nate Bolotin and Nick Spicer were listed in Variety's New Leaders in Film featured profile. Their 2017 film I Don't Feel at Home in this World Anymore was awarded the Grand Jury Prize in Drama at the 2017 Sundance Film Festival.

Selected filmography

References

External links
 

2008 establishments in California
American companies established in 2008
Companies based in Los Angeles
Entertainment companies based in California
Film production companies of the United States
International sales agents